Christopher M. Corrinet (born October 29, 1978) is a retired American professional ice hockey right winger who played eight games for the Washington Capitals during the 2001–02 NHL season. Corrinet was born in Trumbull, Connecticut, but grew up in Greenfield, Massachusetts.

External links

1978 births
American men's ice hockey right wingers
HDD Olimpija Ljubljana players
Ice hockey players from Connecticut
Living people
People from Trumbull, Connecticut
Philadelphia Phantoms players
Portland Pirates players
Princeton Tigers men's ice hockey players
Victoria Salmon Kings players
Washington Capitals draft picks
Washington Capitals players
Worcester IceCats players